Marlon Rojas (born November 11, 1979 in Arima) is a Trinidadian footballer who currently is a player/coach at Bermudian side Somerset Eagles.

Career

College
Rojas came to the United States to play college soccer, first with St. John's University, and then the University of Tampa, with whom he won the NCAA Division II Championship in 2001.

Professional
Upon graduating college, Rojas went back to Trinidad to play for Joe Public, before signing with Real Salt Lake prior to team's inaugural season in 2005. He only lasted with the team until June. Rojas also played a season with the Atlanta Silverbacks of the USL First Division in 2006

Rojas joined the Bermuda Hogges of the USL Second Division in 2009, and in doing so became the first non-Bermudian player in club history. In summer 2010 Rojas was named player/coach of Bermudian side Somerset Eagles.

International
Rojas has played for the Trinidad and Tobago national team on various youth levels and has been a member of the squad during World Cup 2006 qualifiers. He currently has 23 caps.

References

External links
 

1979 births
Living people
Atlanta Silverbacks players
Major League Soccer players
St. John's Red Storm men's soccer players
Trinidad and Tobago footballers
Real Salt Lake players
USL First Division players
Trinidad and Tobago international footballers
Joe Public F.C. players
TT Pro League players
Bermuda Hogges F.C. players
Expatriate footballers in Bermuda
USL Second Division players
Tampa Spartans men's soccer players
People from Arima
Association football defenders
Police F.C. (Trinidad and Tobago) players
Trinidad and Tobago expatriate sportspeople in Bermuda
Trinidad and Tobago expatriate sportspeople in the United States
Trinidad and Tobago expatriate footballers